The Mechanical and Chemical Industry Corporation ( or MKE for short), established in 1950, is a reorganization of government-controlled group of factories in Turkey that supplied the Turkish Armed Forces with military products.

History
Its roots lie in the "Tophane-i Amire" ("Royal Arsenal") built in the latter part of the 15th Century to supply the Ottoman Empire's artillery corps with cannon, powder, and shot. This was reorganized in 1832 as the "Tophane Müşavirliği" ("Arsenal of Ordnance and Artillery Marshalship") and was later formed in a department of "Harbiye Nezareti" (Ministry of War) in 1908. After World War I and the following "Young Turks" revolt, it was reorganized as the "General Directorate of Military Factories" in 1923. Today, the MKE is made up of 12 facilities that employ 7,430 personnel.

Legal status
The company's legal status has changed from state-owned enterprise to a corporation, with the Law Nr. 7330 dated July 3rd, 2021.

Products

The corporation mainly produces equipment for the Turkish Armed Forces, such as the ammunition for small arms and heavy weapons, artillery systems, aerial bombs, mines, explosives, and rockets. MKEK also manufactures civil-purpose products such as steel, brass, and electrical parts and equipment. Its large range of defense industry products are not only demanded in Turkey, but are exported to more than 40 countries worldwide.

In 2011, the company has sold military products to 29 countries worldwide. The first smoothbore gun for Altay main battle tank was introduced in 2011.

Production groups:
Ammunition Group
Rocket Group
Weapons Group
Explosives, Propellants, and Pyrotechnic Products Group
Company and factories: there are 11 factories and 1 company affiliated with MKE located in three major manufacturing hubs:
Kırıkkale
Ammunition Factory
Brass Factory
Heavy Weapons Factory And Steel Foundry
Explosives Factory
Small-Arms Weapons Factory (Kırıkkale Arsenal Co.)
Ankara
Explosive & Propellant Factory
Machinery and Gas-Mask Factory MAKSAM
Pyrotechnics Factory
Scrap Recycling Plant
Small-Arms Ammunition Factory
Çankırı
Medium-Caliber Weapons Factory
İzmit
Scrap Recycling Plant

MKE Maksam Machine and Mask Factory 

MKE Maksam ( or MAKSAM for short) was founded in 1920. The company's line of business includes the manufacturing of surgical appliances and supplies also CBRN masks and products, various masks are produced for the army and civilians. During COVID-19 pandemic Maksam produced millions of Surgical Mask, FFP3 Type Mask, Protective Coverall, Goggles Type A-B, Face Protection Visor Type C, Protective Gloves, Panoramic Mask Set, P13 Plastic Strainer and MKE Surgical Mask Production Machines.

SAHRA Mechanical Respirator 
Apart from masks and protective equipment, SAHRA Mechanical Respirator was produced by making use of local and national facilities in order to provide basic respiratory support to COVID-19 patients. SAHRA is ready for mass production by the end of May 2020 and has a weekly production capacity of 500 pieces.

Aircraft
 MKEK-1 Gözcü (Turkish - "Observer")
 MKEK-2 6 planes were produced
 MKEK-3
 MKEK-4 Uğur (Turkish: "Luck") 57 planes were produced, three of which were donated to the Royal Jordanian Air Force.
 MKEK-5 Twin-engine aircraft developed bt in Turkey in 1945 as an air ambulance.
 MKEK-6
 MKEK-7
 THK-16

Vehicles 

T-155 Fırtına 155 mm SP Howitzer Weapon System
MKE Yavuz T-155 Truck-mounted 155 mm self-propelled gun

Engineering and Ammunition Resupply Vehicles 

 MKEK POYRAZ - Ammunition resupply vehicle
 MKE TAMKAR Mine-clearing line charge system
 MKE TAMGEÇ Mine-clearing line charge system.

Weapons

Small Arms 

 MKE MPT -  MPT-76 and MPT-55 National Infantry Rifle
MKE KAAN-717 - 7.62×51mm NATO 90mm shorter carbine version of the MPT-76
 Heckler & Koch HK33 -A2/A3 (licensed production)
Heckler & Koch G3 - (licensed production) G3-A3/A4/A7
HK416 - (licensed production)
 MKE Bora-12 Sniper Rifle
 MKE JNG-90 Sniper Rifle
 KNT-76 Sniper Rifle
 Heckler & Koch MP5 - (licensed production) MP5-A2/A3/K
 MTS-A2/A3
 MKE T-41/43/50/94 other guns
 T40-R/R5 Grenade Launcher (also for IWI Tavor  X95s)
MG3 (licensed production)
MGL (licensed production)
Mk 19 (licensed production)
MKE CS Tear Gas Grenade
MKE MOD 56 Riot Control Hand Grenade
MKE MK2-3 Hand Grenade
MOT-919 Submachine gun
MKE MMT (Modern Machine Gun)
MKE PMT-76 Machine Gun
MKE PMT-57A Machine Gun
MKE MAM-15 anti-materiel sniper rifle

Artillery - rockets - missiles 

 Panter howitzer 155 mm/52-calibre towed SP howitzer gun
 MKE 120 mm tank gun
 105 mm M68 Tank Gun Weapon System
 Oerlikon 20 mm (licensed production) anti-aircraft gun for double barrel GAI 001 system
Oerlikon 35 mm (licensed production) double barrel anti-aircraft gun for towed MKE GDF-003B and other systems
 107 mm MBRL
 70 mm MKE FFAR (licensed production) air to ground and surface to surface unguided rocket
 60 mm Commando Mortar
 120 mm HY1-12 Grooved Mortar
MKE 81mm UT1
MKE 81mm NT1
MO-120 RT-61 (Mortier 120mm Raye Tracte Modele F1)
Eryx anti-tank guided missile (licensed production)
MKE Boran  Air Transportable Light Towed Howitzer. (Based on L118.)
MKE 66 mm light anti-tank system
MKE Aircraft bombs - MK-84 and MK-82
MKE Penetrator bomb -  870 Kg 2.1 m thick used on Turkish Air Force F-4 Terminator 2020s and F-16 Falcons

Protective gear 

 MAKSAM Panaromic Gas Mask
 MKE NEFES CBRN Gas Mask
SR6 and SR6M NBC Respirator licensed production.
 SR10 and SR10 ST Gas Masks

Museums of the MKE 

 MKE Industry and Technology Museum (Ankara)
 Kırıkkale MKE Weapons Industry Museum (Kırıkkale)

Sports clubs associated with the MKE 
 MKE Ankaragücü
 MKE Kırıkkalespor
 MKE Çankırıspor
 MKE Gazi Fişek Spor
 MKE Maske Spor

References

External links
Official website

Manufacturing companies established in 1950
Defence companies of Turkey
Manufacturing companies based in Ankara
Government-owned companies of Turkey
Turkish companies established in 1950
Engineering companies of Turkey
Aircraft manufacturers of Turkey
Ministry of National Defense (Turkey)
Turkish brands
Science and technology in Turkey